Prosopocera griseomaculata is a species of beetle in the family Cerambycidae. It was described by Stephan von Breuning in 1936. It is known from Ghana.

References

Endemic fauna of Ghana
Prosopocerini
Beetles described in 1936